Mohammad Dehghani Noghondar nicknamed
Mohammad Dehghan (born January 1963) is an Iranian conservative politician, who is currently serving as the vice president for legal affairs in the administration of President Ebrahim Raisi. 

He is also former jurist member of Guardian Council. He was member of Parliament from Chenaran, Torghabeh and Shandiz district. He was also acting deputy chairman of the parliament in May 2016. He was chairman of Mohammad Bagher Ghalibaf's  2017 presidential campaign.

References

1963 births
Living people
University of Tehran alumni
Members of the 7th Islamic Consultative Assembly
Members of the 8th Islamic Consultative Assembly
Members of the 9th Islamic Consultative Assembly
Members of the 10th Islamic Consultative Assembly
Islamic Revolutionary Guard Corps officers
Society of Pathseekers of the Islamic Revolution politicians
Secretaries-General of political parties in Iran
Iranian campaign managers
Members of the Guardian Council